Bulbocavernosus may refer to:
The bulbospongiosus muscle, also called bulbocavernosus muscle
Bulbocavernosus reflex